Tandur railway station  (station code: TDU) is an Indian Railways station in Tandur, Vikarabad district in Indian state of Telangana. It is located on the –Wadi line of Secunderabad railway division in South Central Railway zone.

History 
The Wadi–Secunderabad line was built in 1874 with financing by the Nizam of Hyderabad. It later became part of Nizam's Guaranteed State Railway.

Structure & expansion 
Tandur railway station has three platforms and four tracks each running to 650 meters in length, a general and reservation booking office, shelters, lighting, benches, Parking, Skyway, waiting room, and toilet facility available.

References

Secunderabad railway division